

Central bank
Banco de Portugal

Major banks
Abanca
ActivoBank 
Banco Angolano de Negócios e Comércio
Banco BAI Europa 
Banco EuroBIC
Banco BIG 
Banco Bilbao Vizcaya Argentaria 
Banco Carregosa
Banco CTT
Banco Comercial Português
Banco de Negócios Internacional
Banco do Brasil
Banco Efisa
Banco Finantia
Banco Internacional do Funchal 
Banco Invest
Banco Popular
Banco Português de Gestão
Banco Português de Investimento 
Banco Primus
Banco Privado Atlantico Europa
Banco Santander Totta
Banif Mais
Barclays Bank
Best Bank
Bison Bank
Caixa Geral de Depósitos 
Caja Duero
Crédito Agrícola
Deutsche Bank
Montepio Geral
Novo Banco

 
Portugal
Banks
Portugal